Tamer Başoğlu (born 1938) is a Turkish sculptor.

He was born in 1938 in Nazilli.

Higher education
In 1960 he graduated from the sculpture department of the Istanbul State Fine Arts Academy. With a state scholarship he went to Italy. In 1964 he returned to the academy as assistant. In 1968 he worked with Kirschner and Emilio Vedova at the Salzburg Summer Academy.

Career
In 1970 he earned the title of associate professor. In 1976 he earned the title of professor.

In 1983 he became the head of the Department of Sculpture at Mimar Sinan Fine Arts University and remained the head until 1990. In 1990 he became the Dean of the Faculty of Fine Arts at the university and stayed the dean until 1994. From 1994 to 2000 he was the Rector of the university.

For some time later he was the president of the YOK council of Fine Arts Branches in Universities.

In 2012 he became a full time professor at the Department of Industrial Product Design at the Faculty of Fine Arts at Işık University.

Awards
He won 20 awards. Of these the awards that Başoğlu finds important are his Iskenderiye Biennale bronze medal and the İş Bank Sculpture Division Grand Prize.

References

External links
Personal website

1938 births
Academy of Fine Arts in Istanbul alumni
Turkish male sculptors
Academic staff of Mimar Sinan Fine Arts University
Living people
People from Nazilli